Melanohalea beringiana is a species of foliose lichen in the family Parmeliaceae. It was described as a new species in 2016. The type was collected near the Richardson Highway, north of Paxson, Alaska, where it was found growing on the bark of a trunk of balsam poplar. The specific epithet beringiana refers to its Alaskan distribution. It is morphologically similar to Melanohalea olivaceoides, but is genetically distinct from that species.

References

beringiana
Lichen species
Lichens described in 2016
Lichens of North America
Taxa named by Helge Thorsten Lumbsch
Taxa named by Ana Crespo
Taxa named by Pradeep Kumar Divakar